The name Gretchen has been used for three tropical cyclones in the Eastern Pacific Ocean.
 Tropical Storm Gretchen (1966)
 Tropical Storm Gretchen (1970)
 Hurricane Gretchan (1974)

Pacific hurricane set index articles